The Nicaragua women's national volleyball team represents Nicaragua in international women's volleyball competitions and friendly matches.

As of late 2021, it has been one of the top teams in Central America's AFECAVOL (Asociación de Federaciones CentroAmericanas de Voleibol) zone.

Results

Central American and Caribbean Games
 2010: 7th

Squad
2010 Central American and Caribbean Games
Head Coach: René Quintana

References

External links
NORCECA
Pinoleros Sports

Volleyball
National women's volleyball teams
Women's sport in Nicaragua